Abetti may refer to:

 Antonio Abetti (1846–1928), Italian astronomer
 Giorgio Abetti (1882–1982), Italian solar astronomer, son of Antonio
 Abetti (crater), a lunar crater named after the two astronomers

pt:Abetti